The Copa do Brasil 1992 was the 4th staging of the Copa do Brasil.

The competition started on July 7, 1992, and concluded on December 13, 1992, with the second leg of the final, held at the Estádio Beira-Rio in Porto Alegre, in which Internacional lifted the trophy for the first time with a 1-0 victory over Fluminense.

Gérson, of Internacional, with 9 goals, was the competition's topscorer.

Format
The competition was disputed by 32 clubs in a knock-out format where all rounds were played in two legs and the away goals rule was used.

Competition stages

References
 Copa do Brasil 1992 at RSSSF

1992
1992 in Brazilian football
1992 domestic association football cups